Rayya may refer to:

Rayya. a character in the tale "Otbah and Rayya" in One Thousand and One Nights
Rayya Mandi (Punjab), a town and nagar panchayat in Amritsar district
Rayya (crater), named after the character from One Thousand and One Nights